3-Dimethylaminoacrolein is an organic compound with the formula Me2NC(H)=CHCHO. It is a pale yellow water-soluble liquid. The compound has a number of useful and unusual properties, e.g. it "causes a reversal of the hypnotic effect of morphine in mice" and has a "stimulating effect in humans".  

It is a stable and comparably nontoxic precursor for the genotoxic, mutagenic, and potentially carcinogenic malondialdehyde. The compound can be thought of as vinylogous dimethylformamide (DMF) and combines the functionalities of an unsaturated aldehyde and an enamine. Therefore, 3-dimethylaminoacrolein and vinamidines derived therefrom (composed of vinylogous amidines) or vinamidinium salts (substituted 1,5-diazapentadienes) can be used as reactive molecular building blocks for the formation of nitrogen-containing heterocycles, such as pyridines, pyrimidines, pyrroles or pyrazoles.

Preparation 
3-Dimethylaminoacrolein is obtained by the addition of dimethylamine to the triple bond of propynal (propargyl aldehyde) via a Reppe vinylation.

Propynal is however an inappropriate starting material for industrial synthesis because of its tendency to explode. Vinyl ethers (such as ethyl vinyl ether) are more suited. They react with phosgene and dimethylformamide (which forms in-situ the Vilsmeier reagent) in 68% yield to 3-ethoxypropenylidene dimethylammonium chloride, an enol ether iminium salt. In the weakly alkaline medium, 3-dimethylaminoacrolein is formed therefrom, which cleaves dimethylamine to form propanedial upon exposure to strong bases (such as sodium hydroxide).

In an alternative route, isobutyl vinyl ether reacts with the iminium chloride derived from DMF and phosgene.  The conversion can be implemented in a continuous process. The iminium salt yields 3-dimethylaminoacrolein in dilute sodium hydroxide solution in 86% yield.

Instead of phosgene, the iminium salt can also be prepared via an inorganic acid chloride, such as phosphoryl trichloride or an organic acid chloride, such as oxalyl chloride.

Use

Reactions with 3-dimethylaminoacrolein 
3-Dimethylaminoacrolein can be used to introduce unsaturated and reactive C3 groups into CH-acidic and nucleophilic compounds.

The activated aldehyde group of 3-dimethylaminoacrolein reacts quantitatively with dialkyl sulfates such as dimethyl sulfate. The products are reactive but unstable decompose at 110 °C back into the starting materials. The products can be easily transformed with nucleophiles such as alkoxides or amines into the corresponding vinylogous amide acetals or amidines.

The stable 3-dimethylaminoacrolein dimethyl acetal is obtained by reaction with sodium methoxide in 62% yield.  3-Dimethylaminoacroleincan be reacted with CH-acidic compounds (such as malononitrile) to 1,3-butadiene derivatives or with cyclopentadiene to an aminofulvene.

With guanidine, 3-dimethylaminoacrolein forms almost quantitatively 2-aminopyrimidine.

The amidine formed with 2-naphthylamine and the dimethyl sulfate adduct can be cyclized with sodium methoxide to give benzo[f]quinoline (1-azaphenanthrene).

N-methylpyrrole forms the 3-(2-N-methylpyrrole)propenal with 3-dimethylaminoacrolein and POCl3 in 49% yield.

Similarly, the preparation of an intermediate for the cholesterol lowering drug fluvastatin via the reaction of a fluoroaryl-substituted N-isopropylindole with 3-dimethylaminoacrolein and POCl3 proceeds similarly.

Occasionally, the iminium salt from the reaction of the Vilsmeier reagent and the vinyl ether (a precursor of 3-dimethylaminopropenal) is directly used for synthesis, e. g. for pyrazoles.

When hydrazine hydrate is used, a pyrazole parent body is formed in 84% yield.

Reactions to vinamidinium salts 
The reaction of 3-dimethylaminoacrolein with dimethylammonium tetrafluoroborate produces virtually quantitatively the vinamidinium salt 3-dimethylaminoacrolein dimethyliminium tetrafluoroborate, which crystallizes better as the perchlorate salt. The salt reacts also with cyclopentadiene in the presence of sodium amide in liquid ammonia to give the aminofulvene derivative.

The same vinamidinium salt 1,1,5,5-tetramethyl-1,5-diazapentadienium chloride is also formed in the reaction of 3-dimethylaminoacrolein with dimethylamine hydrochloride in 70% yield. The two-step reaction of dimethylamine and 70% perchloric acid with 3-dimethylaminoacrolein forms the same iminium salt (herein referred to as 1,3-bis(dimethylamino)trimethinium perchlorate).

Lactones (e.g. γ-butyrolactone) or cyclic ketones (such as cyclopentanone) form with the vinylamidinium salt of 3-dimethylaminoacrolein and dimethylamine hydrochloride the corresponding dienaminones in 91% and 88% yield.

The vinamidinium salt 1,1,5,5-tetramethyl-1,5-diazapentadienium chloride reacts with heterocycles bearing CH-acidic groups to form the corresponding dienamines which can be cyclized with bases to form fused heteroaromatics, such as carbazoles, benzofurans or benzothiophenes.

N-alkylpyrroles are obtained in good yield (86%) in the reaction of the vinamidinium salt with glycine esters, substituted thiophenes (up to 87%) in the reaction with mercaptoacetic acid esters.

The use of 3-dimethylaminoacrolein for the synthesis of 2-chloronicotinic acid (2-CNA) is of industrial interest as an important starting material for agrochemicals and pharmaceuticals. For this purpose, 3-dimethylaminoacrolein is reacted with cyanessigsäureethylester to 2-chlornicotinsäureethylester or with cyanoacetic acid n-butyl ester to 2-Chlornicotinsäure-n-butyl ester in a Knoevenagel reaction.

The resulting esters of 2-chloropyridine carboxylic acid can be hydrolyzed smoothly to 2-chloronicotinic acid.

Other reactions
It reacts weakly alkaline and gives with iron(III) chloride a deep red color.

Related compounds
(Z)-β-Aminoacrolein (H2NCH=CHCHO, CAS# 25186-34-9)
(E)3-(N-Phenyl-N-methyl)aminoacrolein (PhNHCH=CHCHO, CAS# 14189-82-3)

References 

Conjugated aldehydes
Alkene derivatives
Dimethylamino compounds